Lichnowy  is a village in Malbork County, Pomeranian Voivodeship, in northern Poland. It is the seat of the gmina (administrative district) called Gmina Lichnowy.

The village has a population of 762.

References

External links

Lichnowy